The Greatest Shop in the Galaxy is a Big Finish Productions audio drama featuring Lisa Bowerman as Bernice Summerfield, a character from the spin-off media based on the long-running British science fiction television series Doctor Who.

Plot 
Bernice visits the Gigamarket to buy shoes but, typically for her, ends up facing time anomalies and rampaging monsters.

Cast
Bernice Summerfield - Lisa Bowerman
Joseph the Porter - Steven Wickham
Keelor - David Benson
Joggon - Toby Longworth
Tarband - Steven Allen
Borvali Voices - Robert Lock
Shopkeeper - Juliet Warner

External links
Big Finish Productions - Professor Bernice Summerfield: The Greatest Shop in the Galaxy

Bernice Summerfield audio plays
Fiction set in the 27th century